More than 700 living languages are spoken in Indonesia. These figures indicate that Indonesia has about 10% of the world's languages, establishing its reputation as the second most linguistically diverse nation in the world after Papua New Guinea. Most languages belong to the Austronesian language family, while there are over 270 Papuan languages spoken in eastern Indonesia. The language most widely spoken as a native language is Javanese.

Languages in Indonesia are classified into nine categories: national language, locally used indigenous languages, regional lingua francas, foreign and additional languages, heritage languages, languages in the religious domain, English as a lingua franca, and sign languages.

National language 
The official language of Indonesia is Indonesian (locally known as bahasa Indonesia), a standardised form of Malay, which serves as the lingua franca of the archipelago. The vocabulary of Indonesian borrows heavily from regional languages of Indonesia, such as Javanese, Sundanese and Minangkabau, as well as from Dutch, Sanskrit, Portuguese, Arabic and more recently English. 
The Indonesian language is primarily used in commerce, administration, education and the media, and thus nearly every Indonesian speaks the language to varying degrees of proficiency. Most Indonesians speak other languages, such as Javanese, as their first language. This makes plurilingualism a norm in Indonesia.

Indigenous languages and regional lingua francas 

Indonesia recognizes only a single national language, and indigenous languages are recognized at the regional level, although policies vary from one region to another. For example, in the Special Region of Yogyakarta, the Javanese language is the region's official language along with Indonesian. Javanese is the most spoken indigenous language, with native speakers constituting 31.8% of the total population of Indonesia (as of 2010). Javanese speakers are predominantly located in the central to eastern parts of Java and also sizable numbers in most provinces. The next most widely spoken regional languages in the country are Sundanese, local Malay, Madurese and Minangkabau. A sense of Indonesian nationhood exists alongside strong regional identities.

There are hundreds of indigenous languages spoken in Indonesia. Most of them are locally used indigenous languages, a category of languages referring to those spoken at the local, regional level, spoken by a small number of people, ranging from a few to a few thousands of people. These include small languages such as Benggoi, Mombum and Towei. Other languages are spoken at the regional level to connect various ethnicities. For this reason, these languages are known as regional lingua francas (RLFs). According to Subhan Zein, there are at least 43 RLFs in Indonesia, categorized into two types: Malayic RLFs and Non-Malayic RLFs. The former refers to a group of regional lingua francas that are thought of as indigenised varieties of Malay or Indonesian. These include such languages as Ambon Malay, Banjar Malay and Papuan Malay. The latter refers to regional lingua francas that are not associated with Malay or Indonesian, including Biak, Iban and Onin.

Foreign languages
As early as the seventh century AD, the natives of the archipelago began an intense period of trades with those coming from China, India and other countries. This was followed by a long period of colonization by the Dutch and Portugal colonials. The outcome of these processes has been the development of a group of heritage languages spoken by Arab, Chinese, Eurasian and Dutch descendants, among others. Chinese linguistic varieties such as Hokkien, Hakka, and Mandarin are the most common heritage languages. A small number of heritage language speakers speak Arabic and Dutch.

Dutch

Despite the Dutch presence in Indonesia for almost 350 years, as parts of Indonesia were ruled by the Dutch East India Company and the whole of modern Indonesia was in the Dutch East Indies, the Dutch language has no official status in Indonesia. The small minority that can speak the language fluently are either educated members of the oldest generation, or employed in the legal profession, as certain law codes are still only available in Dutch.

English
English has traditionally been categorized as the first foreign language in Indonesia. However, increasing exposure to the language, the decreasing influence of native-speaker norms in the country and the prevalent use of the language as a lingua franca in the broader context such as ASEAN means that the categorization has been put into question. Scholars such as Lowenberg argue that English is best seen as an additional language. Meanwhile, Zein argues that English in Indonesia is best categorized as a lingua franca, an argument parallel with Kirkpatrick's contention on the use of English as a lingua franca in the broader ASEAN context.

Other languages
Other languages, such as Arabic, French, German, Japanese, Korean, Mandarin, Russian, and Spanish, are non-native to Indonesia. These languages are included in the educational curriculum and may be categorized as either foreign or additional languages, depending on the instrumental function of the languages, length and types of exposure, as well as the wide-ranging motivations of the speakers or learners who use and or learn them.

Endangered languages 

There are 726 languages spoken across the Indonesian archipelago in 2009 (dropped from 742 languages in 2007), the second largest multilingual population in the world after Papua New Guinea. Indonesian Papua, which is adjacent to Papua New Guinea, has the most languages in Indonesia. Based on the Expanded Graded Intergenerational Disruption Scale classification used by Ethnologue (formerly the Summer Institute of Linguistics), 63 languages are dying (shown in red on the bar chart, subdivided into Moribund and Nearly Extinct, or Dormant), which is defined as "The only fluent users (if any) are older than child-bearing age."

Language policy

In 2013, Indonesia's then minister of education and culture, Muhammad Nuh, affirmed in January that the teaching of local languages as school subjects would be part of the national education curriculum. Muhammad stated that much of the public worry about the teaching of local languages being left out of the curriculum is misplaced and that the new curriculum will be conveyed to them.

Languages by speakers

The population numbers given below are of native speakers, excepting the figure for Indonesian, which counts its total speakers. The total population of the country was 237.6 million in 2010.

Languages by family
Several prominent languages spoken in Indonesia sorted by language family are:

Austronesian languages – (Malayo-Polynesian branch). Most languages spoken in Indonesia belong to this family, which in return are related to languages spoken in Madagascar, Malaysia, Philippines, New Zealand, Hawaii and various Oceanian countries.
Javanese language, spoken in Yogyakarta, Central Java and East Java. Speakers also found in Lampung since Javanese migrants consists more than half of province's population. Also found throughout Indonesia and by migrants in Suriname. Most populous Austronesian language by number of first language speakers.
Lampung language, two distinct but closely related languages spoken in Lampung, South Sumatra and Banten.
Rejang language, spoken in Bengkulu province.
Malayo-Sumbawan languages:
Malay language, spoken throughout Indonesia. Also used as the national language (officially regulated and designated as Indonesian). Officially recognized in Malaysia (as Bahasa Melayu Malaysia), Singapore, and Brunei.
Acehnese language, spoken in Aceh, especially coastal part of Sumatra island.
Minangkabau language, spoken in West Sumatra.
Banjar language, spoken in South, East, and Central Kalimantan.
Sundanese language, spoken in West Java, Banten and Jakarta.
Balinese language, spoken in Bali.
Madurese language, spoken in Madura, Bawean and surrounding islands off the coast of Java.
Sasak language, spoken in Lombok, West Nusa Tenggara.
Barito languages:
 Ma'anyan language, closely related to the Malagasy language spoken in Madagascar.
Northwest Sumatra–Barrier Islands languages:
Batak languages, seven closely related languages spoken by the Batak people in the highlands of North Sumatra.
Nias language, in Nias island off the western coast of North Sumatra.
Simeulue language, in Simeulue island off the western coast of Aceh.
Gayo language, in Gayo highlands in central Aceh.
South Sulawesi languages:
Bugis language, spoken by Bugis in central South Sulawesi and neighbouring provinces.
Makassarese language, spoken by Makassarese in southern end of South Sulawesi.
Toraja language, spoken by Toraja people in northern highland of South Sulawesi.
Mandar language, spoken in West Sulawesi.
Philippine languages:
 Gorontalo language, spoken in Gorontalo province.
 Mongondow language, spoken in western part of North Sulawesi.
 Minahasan languages, spoken in eastern part of North Sulawesi.
 Sangiric languages, spoken in northern islands part of North Sulawesi.
Oceanic languages
 Sarmi-Jayapura languages, spoken in the northern part of Papua.
Enggano language of Sumatra, unclassified
West Papuan languages, an indigenous language family found only in eastern Indonesia (northern Maluku and western Papua). No discernible relationship with other language families. Distinct from surrounding Austronesian languages.
Ternate language, spoken in Ternate and northern Halmahera.
Tidore language, spoken in Tidore and western Halmahera, closely related to the above Ternate language.
Trans–New Guinea languages, an indigenous language family found in eastern Indonesia (New Guinea, Alor, Timor islands). Consisting of hundreds of languages, including the vernaculars of the Asmat and Dani people.
 Mairasi languages (4)
 East Cenderawasih (Geelvink Bay) languages (10)
 Lakes Plain languages (19; upper Mamberamo River)
 Tor–Kwerba languages (17)
 Nimboran languages (5)
 Skou languages (Skou)
 Border languages (15)
 Senagi languages (2) 
 Pauwasi languages

There are many additional small families and isolates among the Papuan languages.

Below is a full list of Papuan language families spoken in Indonesia, following Palmer, et al. (2018):

Trans-New Guinea
Ok-Oksapmin (also in Papua New Guinea)
Dani
Asmat-Kamoro
Mek
Paniai Lakes
West Bomberai
Somahai
Anim (also in Papua New Guinea)
Greater Awyu
Kayagaric
Kolopom
Marori
Timor-Alor-Pantar
North Halmahera
Tambora†
Nuclear South Bird's Head
Inanwatan–Duriankere
Konda–Yahadian
Nuclear East Bird's Head
Hatam–Mansim
West Bird's Head
Abun
Mpur
Maybrat
Mor
Tanah Merah
Tor-Kwerba
Lakes Plain
Border (also in Papua New Guinea)
Sko (also in Papua New Guinea)
East Cenderawasih Bay
Yam (also in Papua New Guinea)
Komolom
Yelmek-Maklew
Eastern Pauwasi (also in Papua New Guinea)
Western Pauwasi
Nimboran
Sentani
Mairasi
Kaure
Lepki-Murkim
Senagi (Angor-Dera) (also in Papua New Guinea)
Tofanma-Namla
Yapen
Abinomn
Burmeso
Elseng
Kapauri
Kembra
Keuw
Kimki
Massep
Mawes
Molof
Usku
Yetfa
Bayono-Awbono
Dem
Uhunduni

Sign languages
There are at least 2.5 million sign language users across the country, although official report only shows less than 50,000. Sign language users are often ridiculed and stigmatized.

 Indonesian Sign Language
 Yogyakarta Sign Language 
 Jakarta Sign Language
 Kata Kolok

Writing system
Indonesian languages are generally not rendered in native-invented systems, but in scripts devised by speakers of other languages, that is, Tamil, Arabic, and Latin. Malay, for example, has a long history as a written language and has been rendered in Brahmic, Arabic, and Latin scripts. Javanese has been written in the Pallava script of South India, as well as their derivative (known as Kawi and Javanese), in an Arabic alphabet called pegon that incorporates Javanese sounds, and in the Latin script.

Chinese characters have never been used to write Indonesian languages, although Indonesian place-names, personal names, and names of trade goods appear in reports and histories written for China's imperial courts.

List of writing systems
 Latin – The official writing system of Indonesian; most Indonesian vernacular languages now adopt Latin script.
 Kaganga – Historically used to write Rejang, an Austronesian language from Bengkulu. 
 Rencong – A Brahmic-based script, formerly used by Malays before the arrival of Islam, which introduced the Jawi script.
 Sundanese – A Brahmic-based script, used by Sundanese to write the Sundanese language, although Sundanese also has a standard Latin orthography.
 Jawi and Pegon – An Arabic-based script, once widely used throughout Indonesia, now in decline but still used by Malays, Minangkabau, Banjarese, Acehnese, Javanese, Osing, Sundanese, and Madurese (which has its own form of Arabic writing known as Pegon.)
 Javanese – A Brahmic-based script used by the Javanese and related peoples. Today the script is in rapid decline and largely supplanted by Latin.
 Kawi script – The oldest known Brahmic writing system in Indonesia and the ancestor to all Brahmic based writing systems in Insular Southeast Asia. 
 Balinese – A Brahmic-based script used by the Balinese people to write Balinese. It is closely related to Javanese script.
 Rejang – A Brahmic-based script used by the Rejang people of Bengkulu, Sumatra. It is closely related to Kerinci, Lampung and Rencong script.
 Kerinci (Kaganga) – A Brahmic-based script used by the Kerincis to write their language. 
 Batak – A Brahmic-based script, used by the Batak people of North Sumatra.
 Lontara – A Brahmic-based script, used by the Buginese and Makassarese in Sulawesi. 
 Lampung – A Brahmic-based script, still used by Lampung people to write Lampung language, although they are in rapid decline. Lampung script is closely related to Rencong, Kerinci and Rejang script.
 Hangeul Cia-Cia – The Hangeul script used to write the Cia-Cia language in Buton Island, Southeast Sulawesi.

Sample text 

The following texts are translations of Article 1 of the Universal Declaration of Human Rights in the languages of Indonesia.
 Portuguese

 Dutch

 Indonesian (Bahasa Indonesia)

 Javanese (Basa Jawa)

 Malay (Bahasa Melayu)

 Minangkabau (Baso Minangkabau)

 Buginese (Basa Ugi)

 Balinese (Basa Bali)

 Sundanese (Basa Sunda)

 Madurese (Basa Madura)

 Musi (Baso Pelembang)

 Acehnese (Bahsa Acèh)

 Tetum (Lia-Tetun)

 Dawan (Uab Metô)

 Banjar (Bahasa Banjar)

 Lampung (Bahasa Lampung)

 Rejang (Baso Jang)

 Bengkulu Malay (Bahaso Melayu Bengkulu)

Comparison chart
Below is a chart of several Indonesian languages. All of them except for Galela belong to the Austronesian language family. While there have been misunderstandings on which ones should be classified as languages and which ones should be classified as dialects, the chart confirms that many have similarities, yet are not mutually comprehensible. The languages are arranged geographically.

See also 
 List of writing systems of the languages in Indonesia
 Languages of Sulawesi
 Languages of Kalimantan

Notes

References

Citations

Bibliography

External links

Graph of Indonesian ethnolinguistics
Linguistic maps of Indonesia at Muturzikin.com
How many people speak Indonesian?

 
Indonesia culture-related lists
Indonesia

bn:ইন্দোনেশিয়া#ভাষা